Crosby is a suburb of Johannesburg, South Africa. The suburb is west of the Johannesburg CBD and is adjacent to Mayfair West. It is located in Region F of the City of Johannesburg Metropolitan Municipality.

History
The suburb was founded in 1938 on 112ha of land that was survey into 1,163 stands. It is named after Langlaagte Mine director J.H. Crosby.

References

Johannesburg Region F